Gavrilo Vitković (1829 – 1902) was an engineer, historian, professor and collector of old manuscripts. He was a member of the Serbian Learned Society.

Biography

After graduating from the University of Budapest, Vitković worked as an engineer in Smederevo and Šabac. Later, he taught engineering in secondary schools in Kragujevac and Belgrade. And in his spare time he collected original documents and manuscripts mostly about 18th- and 19th- century people from Serbia and granted his collection to the National Library of Serbia.

References

External links 
 Biography on the website of SANU

1829 births
19th-century Serbian historians
Members of the Serbian Academy of Sciences and Arts
1902 deaths